Nacht und Nebel, meaning Night and Fog, was a directive issued by Adolf Hitler on 7 December 1941 targeting political activists and resistance "helpers" in the territories occupied by Nazi Germany during World War II, who were to be imprisoned, murdered, or made to disappear, while the family and the population remained uncertain as to the fate or whereabouts of the alleged offender against the Nazi occupation power. Victims who disappeared in these clandestine actions were never heard from again.

Name
The alliterative hendiadys Nacht und Nebel (German for "Night and Fog") is documented in German since the beginning of the 17th century. It was used by Wagner in Das Rheingold (1869) and has since been adopted into everyday German (e.g. it appears in Thomas Mann's Der Zauberberg, or "The Magic Mountain"). It is not clear whether the term Nacht-und-Nebel-Erlass ("Night and Fog directive") had been in wide circulation or used publicly before 1945. The designation "NN" was sometimes used, however, to refer to prisoners and deportees ("NN-Gefangener", "NN-Häftling", "NN-Sache") at the time. The abbreviation "NN" was otherwise well known in German to mean "nullus nomen" ("without name" for security reasons), similar to the English NN for "nomen nescio".

Background

Even before the Holocaust gained momentum, the Nazis had begun rounding up political prisoners from both Germany and occupied Europe. Most of the early prisoners were of two sorts: they were either political prisoners of personal conviction or belief whom the Nazis deemed in need of "re-education" to Nazi ideals, or resistance leaders in occupied western Europe.

Up until the time of the Nacht und Nebel decree, prisoners from Western Europe were handled by German soldiers in approximately the same way as by other countries: according to international agreements and procedures such as the Geneva Convention. Hitler and his upper-level staff, however, made a critical decision not to conform to what they considered unnecessary rules and in the process abandoned "all chivalry towards the opponent" and removed "every traditional restraint on warfare." During the Nuremberg Trial against the High Command of the Wehrmacht (OKW), the head of the legal department in the OKW, Ministerial Director and General, Dr. Rudolf Lehmann, testified that Hitler had literally demanded opponents of the regime, who could not be immediately given a short trial, should be brought across the border to Germany in the "Night and Fog" and remain isolated there.

On 7 December 1941, Reichsführer-SS Heinrich Himmler issued the following instructions to the Gestapo: 

Armed Forces High Command Feldmarschall Wilhelm Keitel had also received a so-called "Führer's decree" from Hitler on 7 December 1941, and while this order was not documented in writing, Keitel immediately passed it on to the appropriate authorities in the form of "guidelines" and likewise issued a secret decree containing more detailed instructions for its implementation. Essentially, the decree was about how to more effectively combat the increasing resistance actions in the territories occupied by Germany in Western Europe after the beginning of the war against the Soviet Union; thereto, the "Night and Fog" decree originally concerned only nationals of France, Belgium, the Netherlands, Luxembourg and Norway. On 12 December, Keitel issued a directive explaining Hitler's orders:

Three months later Keitel further expanded on this principle in a February 1942 letter stating that any prisoners not executed within eight days were to be handed over to the Gestapo. and 

Reinhard Heydrich's Sicherheitsdienst (Security Service; SD) was given responsibility for over-seeing and carrying out the Nacht und Nebel decree. The SD was mainly an information-gathering agency, while the Gestapo was the main executive agency of the political police system. The decree was meant to intimidate local populations into submission, by denying friends and families of seized persons any knowledge of their whereabouts or their fate. The prisoners were secretly transported to Germany, and vanished without a trace.  In 1945, abandoned SD records were found to include merely names and the initials "NN" (Nacht und Nebel); even the sites of graves were unrecorded. The Nazis even coined a new term for those who "vanished" in accordance with this decree; they were vernebelt—"transformed into mist". To this day, it is not known how many people disappeared as a result of this decree. The International Military Tribunal at Nuremberg held that the disappearances committed as part of the Nacht und Nebel program were war crimes which violated both the Hague Conventions and customary international law.  

Himmler immediately communicated Keitel's directive to various SS stations and within six months, the decree was sent to concentration camp commanders by Richard Glücks. The Nacht und Nebel prisoners were mostly from France, Belgium, Luxembourg, Denmark, the Netherlands, and Norway. They were usually arrested in the middle of the night and quickly taken to prisons hundreds of kilometres away for questioning, eventually arriving at concentration camps such as Natzweiler, Esterwegen or Gross-Rosen, if they survived. 

Natzweiler concentration camp in particular, became an isolation camp for political prisoners from northern and western Europe under the decree's mandate. Natzweiler was the most prominent concentration camp with NN prisoners and probably also the one in which most of them spent the longest time. When the concentration camps in the east and west of German-occupied Europe were dissolved in the face of the advancing Allied armies and their inmates evacuated, often on cruel death marches, centrally located camps such as Dachau and Mauthausen were filled with thousands of NN prisoners at the end of the war, whose special status was largely lost in the chaos of the last months before the liberation. 

Up to 30 April 1944, at least 6,639 persons had been arrested under Nacht und Nebel orders. Some 340 of them may have been executed. The 1956 film Night and Fog, directed by Alain Resnais, uses the term to illustrate one aspect of the concentration camp system as it was transformed into a system of labour and death camps.

Text of the decrees

Rationale
The reasons for Nacht und Nebel were many. The policy, enforced in Nazi-occupied countries, meant that whenever someone was arrested, the family would learn nothing about the person's fate. The people arrested, sometimes only suspected resisters, were secretly sent to Germany and perhaps to a concentration camp. Whether they lived or died, the Germans would give out no information to the families involved. This was done to keep the population in occupied countries quiet by promoting an atmosphere of mystery, fear and terror.

The program made it far more difficult for other governments or humanitarian organizations to accuse the German government of specific misconduct because it obscured whether or not internment or death had even occurred, let alone the cause of the person's disappearance.  It thereby kept the Nazis from being held accountable. It allowed across-the-board, silent defiance of international treaties and conventions – one cannot apply the requirements for humane treatment in war if one cannot locate a victim or discern that victim's fate. Additionally, the policy lessened German subjects' moral qualms about the Nazi regime, as well as their desire to speak out against it, by keeping the general public ignorant of the regime's malfeasance and by creating extreme pressure for service members to remain silent.

Treatment of prisoners

The Nacht und Nebel prisoners' hair was shaved and the women were given a convict costume of a thin cotton dress, wooden sandals and a triangular black headcloth. According to historian Wolfgang Sofsky,

Prisoners of the Nacht und Nebel transports were marked by broad red bands; on their backs and both trouser legs was a cross, with the letters "NN" to its right. From these emblems, it was possible to recognize immediately what class a prisoner belonged to and how he or she was pigeonholed and evaluated by the SS.

The prisoners were often moved apparently at random from prison to prison such as Fresnes Prison in Paris, Waldheim near Dresden, Leipzig, Potsdam, Lübeck and Stettin. The deportees were sometimes herded 80 at a time with standing room only into slow moving, dirty cattle wagons  with little or no food or water on journeys lasting up to five days to their next unknown destination.

At the camps, the prisoners were forced to stand for hours in freezing and wet conditions at 5:00 a.m. every morning, standing strictly to attention, before being sent to work a twelve-hour day with only a twenty-minute break for a scant meal. They were confined in cold and starving conditions; many had dysentery or other illnesses, and the weakest were often beaten to death, shot, guillotined, or hanged, while the others were subjected to torture by the Germans.

When the inmates were totally exhausted or if they were too ill or too weak to work, they were then transferred to the Revier (Krankenrevier, sick barrack) or other places for extermination. If a camp did not have a gas chamber of its own, the so-called Muselmänner, or prisoners who were too sick to work, were often murdered or transferred to other concentration camps for extermination.

When the Allies liberated Paris and Brussels, the SS transported many of its remaining Nacht und Nebel prisoners to concentration camps deeper in Nazi-controlled territory, such as Ravensbrück concentration camp for women, Mauthausen-Gusen concentration camp, Buchenwald concentration camp, Schloss Hartheim, or Flossenbürg concentration camp.

Results

Early in the war, the program caused the mass execution of political prisoners, especially Soviet military prisoners, who in early 1942 outnumbered the Jews in number of deaths even at Auschwitz. As the transports grew and Hitler's troops moved across Europe, that ratio changed dramatically. The Nacht und Nebel decree was carried out surreptitiously, but it set the background for orders that would follow and established a "new dimension of fear". As the war continued, so did the openness of such decrees and orders.

It can be surmised from various writings that in the beginning the German public knew only a little of the plans Hitler had to enforce a "New European Order". As the years passed, despite the best attempts of Goebbels and the Propaganda Ministry with its formidable domestic information control, diaries and periodicals of the time show that information about the harshness and cruelty of the program became progressively known to the German public.

Soldiers brought back information, families on rare occasion heard from or about loved ones, and Allied news sources and the BBC were able to get past censorship sporadically. Although captured archives from the SD contain numerous orders stamped with "NN" (Nacht und Nebel), it has never been determined exactly how many people disappeared as a result of the decree.

Hesitant if not outright skeptical at first of reports coming in about the atrocities being committed by the Nazis, the Allies' doubts were pushed aside when the French entered the Natzweiler-Struthof camp (one of the Nacht und Nebel facilities) on 23 November 1944, and discovered a chamber where victims were hung by their wrists from hooks to accommodate the process of pumping poisonous Zyklon-B gas into the room. Keitel later testified at the Nuremberg Trials that of all the illegal orders he had carried out, the Nacht und Nebel decree was "the worst of all".

Former Supreme Court Justice and chief prosecutor at the international Nuremberg trial, Robert H. Jackson listed the "terrifying" Nacht und Nebel decree with the other crimes committed by the Nazis in his closing address. In part because of his role in carrying out this decree, Keitel was sentenced to death by hanging, despite his insistence on being shot instead due to his military service and rank. At 1:20 a.m. on 16 October 1946 Keitel defiantly shouted out, "Alles für Deutschland! Deutschland über alles!" just before the trap door opened beneath his feet.

Notable prisoners

Trygve Bratteli (Norwegian Resistance, later Prime Minister)
Virginia d'Albert-Lake (American)
Charles Delestraint (French Resistance)
Andrée de Jongh ("Dédée") (Belgian Resistance)
Noor Inayat Khan
Mary Lindell (Comtesse de Milleville)
Henriette Bie Lorentzen
Elsie Maréchal (Belgian Resistance)
Henriette Roosenburg
Xavier, Duke of Parma

See also

Commando Order
Commissar Order
Le prisonnier politique - a 1949 sculpture
Resistance during World War II 
Belgian Resistance
Dutch Resistance
French Resistance
Norwegian resistance movement
List of Nazi-German concentration camps
Black jails (China)
Extraordinary rendition (US)
Forced disappearance
Ghost detainee (War on Terror)
National Defense Authorization Act (US)
Timeline of SOE's Prosper Network 
Without the right of correspondence (USSR)
The Walls Came Tumbling Down (1957 book)
List of books about Nazi Germany

References
Notes

Bibliography

 Barnett, Correlli, ed., (2003). Hitler's Generals. New York: Grove Press.
 
 Browning, Christoper, and Jürgen Matthäus (2004). The Origins of the Final Solution: The Evolution of Nazi Jewish Policy, September 1939–March 1942. Lincoln: University of Nebraska Press.
 Conot, Robert E. (2000) [1983]. Justice at Nuremberg. New York: Carroll & Graf Publishers.
 Crankshaw, Edward (1990). Gestapo: Instrument of Tyranny. London: Greenhill Books. 
 Dülffer, Jost (2009). Nazi Germany 1933-1945: Faith and Annihilation. London: Bloomsbury.
 Gellately, Robert (2001). Backing Hitler: Consent and Coercion in Nazi Germany. New York: Oxford University Press.
 Huhle, Rainer. "Nacht und Nebel – Mythos und Bedeutung." Zeitschrift für Menschenrechte 8, no. 1 (2014): 120–135.  
 Johnson, Eric (2006). What We Knew: Terror, Mass Murder, and Everyday Life in Nazi Germany. New York: Basic Books. 
 Kaden, Helma, and Ludwig Nestler, eds., (1993). Dokumente des Verbrechens: Aus den Akten des Dritten Reiches. 3 Bände. Vol i.  Berlin: Dietz Verlag.
 Kammer, Hilde and Elisabet Bartsch (1999). Lexikon Nationalsozialismus: Begriffe, Organisationen und Institutionen (Rororo-Sachbuch). Hamburg: Rowohlt Taschenbuch.
 Kogon, Eugen (2006) [1950]. The Theory and Practice of Hell: The German Concentration Camps and the System behind Them. New York: Farrar, Straus and Giroux. 
 Lowe Keith (2012). Savage Continent: Europe in the Aftermath of World War II. New York: Picador.
 Manchester, William (2003). The Arms of Krupp, 1587-1968: The Rise and Fall of the Industrial Dynasty that Armed Germany at War. New York & Boston: Back Bay Books.
 Mayer, Arno (2012) [1988]. Why Did the Heavens Not Darken?: The "Final Solution" in History. London & New York: Verso Publishing. 
 Overy, Richard (2006). The Dictators: Hitler's Germany, Stalin's Russia. New York: W. W. Norton & Company. 
 Shirer, William L. (1990). The Rise and Fall of the Third Reich. New York:  MJF Books. Originally published in [1959]. Drawing upon Nazi Conspiracy and Aggression, part of the Nuremberg Documents, Vol. VII, pages 871-874, Nuremberg Document L-90.
 Sofsky, Wolfgang (1997). The Order of Terror: The Concentration Camp. Translated by William Templer. Princeton, NJ: Princeton University Press.
 Spielvogel, Jackson (1992). Hitler and Nazi Germany: A History. New York: Prentice Hall. 
 Stackelberg, Roderick (2007). The Routledge Companion to Nazi Germany. New York: Routledge.
 Taylor, James, and Warren Shaw (2002) Dictionary of the Third Reich. New York: Penguin.
 Toland, John (1976). Adolf Hitler. New York: Doubleday. 
 
 United States Holocaust Memorial Museum. (2014). Holocaust Encyclopedia, "Night and Fog Decree"

Further reading
 Harthoorn, Willem Lodewijk. Verboden te sterven, Van Gruting, 2007,  – A personal account of a person who survived as a "Night and Fog" prisoner four months in Gross-Rosen and a year in Natzweiler

External links

Hassall, Peter D., (1997), Night and Fog Prisoners.

Nazi war crimes
Crimes against humanity
 
Holocaust terminology
Law in Nazi Germany
Orders by Adolf Hitler
December 1941 events
1941 in Germany
1941 documents
German words and phrases
Political quotes
1940s neologisms